Cossus orientalis is a moth in the family Cossidae. It is found in North Korea and China (Jilin), Russia and Japan.

References

Natural History Museum Lepidoptera generic names catalog

Cossus
Moths described in 1929
Moths of Asia